The American rock band Dope has released seven studio albums, one compilation album and 20 singles. The band released its first two studio albums on record label Epic Records, the next two on Artemis Records and their most recent album on Koch Records. The band's songs have appeared on movies, TV shows and video games. A song from their first album, Felons and Revolutionaries appeared in the movie The Fast and the Furious. They also recorded WWE chairman Vince McMahon's theme song, "No Chance in Hell". Five songs from American Apathy feature in the video game MTX Mototrax. Their song "Nothing for Me Here", from their album No Regrets, is featured in the video game Guitar Hero III: Legends of Rock.

Albums

Studio albums

Compilation albums

Live albums

Singles

Other appearances
As with many industrial metal music stars, Edsel Dope has been involved with the supergroup Pigface. The following are some remixes of the Dope track "Bitch" that have featured on Pigface releases.

Easy Listening... – (January 2003)
"Bitch (Mattress mix)"

Head – (August 2003)
"Bitch (Defrag's Extraordinary Skipping Glitch mix)" and "Bitch (Passive/Aggressive remix)"

Dubhead – (May 2004)
"Bitch (Bitch & Scratch)"

Clubhead Nonstopmegamix #1 – (June 2004)
"Bitch (Where's My Bitch edit)"

Pigface Presents Crackhead: The DJ? Acucrack Remix Album – (August 2004)
"Bitch (Own Your Own Edsel)"

''8 Bit Head: Complete Remix of Easy Listening + Other Stuff – (October 2004)
"Bitch (Defrag's Extraordinary Skipping Glitch mix)" and "Bitch Dance"

They also appeared on WWF Forceable Entry with the song "No Chance" and on Take A Bite Outta Rhyme with the song "New Jack Hustler".

Music videos

References

 
Heavy metal group discographies
Discographies of American artists